Oinam Hill, also Onaeme village is a Poumai Naga village situated at some 40 km from Senapati district Headquarters and 20 km from NH-39/2 at Maram Town point and roughly 80 km from Kohima, Nagaland falling under Purul Sub-division in the present Manipur state. It is located in the heart of the Leopaona area surrounded by Thingba Khullen and Thingba Khunou in the West, Purul in the East, Khongdei and Ngamju in the north and the beautiful Barak River in the south. The village has rich forest land with varied flora and fauna. Onaeme village is located on a hillock with a sloping curve from north to south and east to west.

Oinam Hill village has got the distinction of having the highest number of medical doctors among the poumai naga tribe.

History
The story of Onaeme (Oinam) Hill Village is interwoven with the legend of the migration of Naga tribes from Makhre (Makhel) or its adjacent area. The legendary passed down from the past in forms of folk lore, songs et al., tell a tale of an ancestral mother giving a divine direction to the ancestor and ancestress of this village. The legend says of ancestral mother having said this to the ancestors of Oinam/Onaeme before the dispersal from Makhre (Makhel), "...the man in whose meal pack contains cat's head is the eldest in the family. You must go and search for a land and settle there where the roaster does crow and where you get the right smell of the soil for making earthen pot..." It is said that before the dispersal, the ancestors of the Oinam/Onaeme were making earthen pot for utensils and for rites and rituals purposes for the Naga tribes living together in Makhre (Makhel). The language of this village is quite unique from the rest of Poumai villages. This peculiar tongue is believed to be God's gift for trade convenience of selling pottery items.

With the mass migration of the Naga tribes, the ancestors of Oinam/Onaeme along with other villages took a route through the Barak Valley in the west, proceeded towards Nghaphouzhe range and eventually reached Koide and took meal there and sojourned at Paodiifii for a while. The ancestors of Oinam/Onaeme found a cat's head in their meal pack, and then they realized the words of ancestral mother that in whose meal pack the cat's head was found is the eldest. Then they were contented and happy. From there, they move on searching for their rightful destiny which the ancestral mother had instructed them. It was when they reach the hills of Oinam/Onaeme, the roaster did crow and the ancestress got the right smell of the soil when she dug up the mud with her walking stick. Thus, they settled in these hills as their permanent village as the land fulfilled the divine description spelled out by the ancestral mother before the exodus from Makhre (Makhel).

In recent past due to the increasing population and space congestion for dwelling and cultivation purposes, some of the villagers have migrated and established new villages. They are Ngamju, Tingsong, Sorbung, Oinam Laila and Taphou Onaeme villages. Besides this, some of the Oinam villagers had been migrated to Ukhrul district and Thangal area in Senapati District and absorbed into the tribe where they dwell now.

Onaeme Earthen Pottery (Pouli)
The sacred art of Oinam Pottery making called 'Pouli' in Poumai dialect, whereas in Onaeme dialect it is popularly called as 'Orae La' is indigenous, traditional and primitive one. Only the women folk can practice the pot making and in the history no men can practice except helping in the process of collection of mud, burning materials (dry twigs/sticks, straw), transportation and selling. If not the whole process is done by the women folk in group or single.

Only women of native Onaeme/Oinam can practice pottery making and that also restricted to within the Oinam Hill Village only. Women married to outsiders cannot practice the art of pottery. Therefore, pottery making is solely confined within the territory of Oinam Hill/Onaeme village excepting the exhibitions outside.

Onaeme earthen pottery making popularly known as Pouli has close affinity and identity with the history, religion, culture, tradition, economy of this village and many Naga tribes. In the past the many Naga tribes depended on the earthen wares produced by this village for utensils, to perform rites and rituals. In significant social events like 'Feast of Merit', 'New House Dedication,' 'Marriage Ceremony', 'Child Dedication' 'performing death rituals' and in almost all other festivals, a piece/part or whole of the earthen pot was used in the past and is still using till today in performing rites and rituals and without that the ceremony is incomplete. It is an obligatory item that cannot be missed out.

As the village (Onaeme) was blessed with the art of Pottery making (popularly known as Pouli), the village was once a mini-commercial hub for the many neighboring villages and tribes. Thus, the pottery industry with the agricultural activity sustains the village economy in the past.

However, with the introduction of aluminum utensils in the market, the use of these earthen wares lost its relevance, and thus posits a threat to the potters for their source of income and livelihood. Notwithstanding the threat, the practice of making pottery didn't die down with the rapid modernization and till to this day the potters of Oinam/Onaeme continue to make and produce earthen wares if not in large scale than in small scale.

The 9 July 1987 Onae Reh Dah- The Great Battle of Oinam

The serene live of Oinam village become quite a nightmare of terror and horror when the Assam Rifles Outpost near this village was raided in broad daylight by NSCN insurgents. On 9 July 1987 suspected NSCN (National Socialist Council of Nagaland) raided Assam Rifles outpost at Oinam Hill Village at around 12.30 p.m. and left with a large quantity of arms and ammunition. Nine soldiers were killed in the attack and three were seriously injured. It is reported that the insurgents stole 18 LMG, 128 SLR, 4 two inches Mortar, 20 Carbine Sten, 400 Grenades, 1,28,000 rounds of ammunition and two wireless sets.

The story of Oinam nightmare could not be ended just in few words and pages. It was one of the biggest operations carried out by the Indian Security Forces since 1950s in Naga areas. Later on it became a unique struggle in Naga history. Naga People Movement for Human Rights in their report based on 2nd and 3rd reports of The Co-ordinating Committee on Oinam Issue (COCOI) termed "Operation Bluebird" as the biggest operation in recent times. "But this time there was difference. The villagers did not remain silent. They have dared to speak out, and with the help of NPMHR they took the armed forces to court." The report also says, "It is a unique struggle in the annals of Naga History." It cuts across the boundaries when it comes to torture of human beings and human rights violations. Be it journalists, Government Top Officials, Politicians, Students Activists, Human Rights Activists from Manipur, Nagaland and even beyond were not spared under the wave of 'Operation Blue Bird' which was launched on 11 July 1987, with an attempt to recover the arms. Major General P.L.Kukrety, Inspector General of the Assam Rifles and General Officer in Command of the Manipur section of the Assam Rifles and Brigadier B.N.Singh, Manipur Sector supervised the operation, which covered more than thirty Naga villages. Wide scale human rights abuses were committed during the combing operation, including torture and extrajudicial executions. In the course of these operations at least fifteen were killed in the custody of the security forces, after severe torture, says NPMHR's petition.

The NPMHR in their petition filed in October 1987 to the Gauhati High Court, alleged that the security forces committed the following cognizable offences: murder, manslaughter, infliction of grievous injuries, rape and sexual harassment; arson, looting and theft; desecration of Church; wanton destruction of public and private properties; including school buildings; illegal evictions; illegal raids, seizures; illegal detentions and arrests and forced labour.

Around thirty villages were affected, 125 residents houses are alleged burnt, 112 like houses were dismantled, 6 schools and 10 churches were dismantled, properties worth of Rs.50,75,000/- were looted from seven villages and villagers belonging to five villages were forced to work, 27 persons are alleged to have been killed in the encounter on different dates in Senapati District of Manipur, 3 women were alleged raped and five women were alleged sexually molested and 300 persons are alleged tortured by Assam Rifles as enumerated by the Naga People's Movement for Human Rights.

The names of people tortured and killed were P. Sanglong, Chairman of Oinam Village Authority, B. Wa, Gaonburas of Oinam Village Authority, Th. Wakhao, Gaonburas of Oinam, P.L. Ring, headmaster of Oinam High School, L. Zamo, headman of Khongdei Khuman, K. Sunai, gaonburas of Khongdei Khuman, R. Khova, gaonburas of Khongdei Khuman, M. Esou, gaonburas of Khongdei Shimphung, N. Thava, member of Khongdei Shimphung Village Authority, R. Mathotmi, member of the Ngari Lishang village authority, P. Rangkhiwo, headman, Ngari Lishang village headman. The following persons were killed during the incident though in lesser known evidence of the nature of their death, S. Sosang, a farmer from Ngamju village, Mr. Seva of Thingba Khunou, Mr Lokho of Mao Pudunamei and Mr. Sangdua of Oinam village.

The report stated in the booklet, 'Post Torture State of Mental health' written by 7 Doctors from outside Manipur got to write this, 'Torture is a cruel, inhuman degradation of one human being by another. Among the 104 victims studied by us, the high prevalence of Post Traumatic Stress Disorders correlates well with the incident of the torture of the victims. In some cases, the physical torture has been so severe that the victims have suffered permanent damage to their physical health as well. All this has naturally led to a great level of disability and incapacity to carry out day-to-day activities. Though this study was based on a purposive sample, it is held adequate to draw the conclusion that PTSD is high among the victims and is related to their being tortured by the personnel of the Assam Rifles.'

They also further reported, "There is an unquestionable relationship with the type and nature of torture with their symptoms, like 'recurrent distressing dreams of the event', 'falling and staying asleep', 'recurrent and intrusive painful recollection of the torture', etc. Barking dogs, sounds of resembling gun shot, sight of olive green dress or even the colour, sound of jeep, sound of helicopter, sounds of children running downhill simulating marching troops, still disturbed these victims with vivid memories of torture and intense psychological distress. It is found from the study that the percentage of victims still suffering from recurrent dreams of torture (38.61%) and disturbed sleep (66.33%) is fairly high. Major groups of people are still having the problem of maintaining social relationship with other members of the family and village. They are incapable of enjoying village festivals, food, sex and even friendships (54.44%). A good number of victims have lost their self-confidence and developed a sense of foreshortened future (37.62%). The reports continues to say, 'The results of the present study show that individuals who are subjected to torture and their family members who are often forced to witness the torture, have developed serious mental health problems."

The Oinam Hills/Onaeme people spread across the country commemorate every 9 July as a day of Onae Reh Dah- Great Battle of Oinam in prayers and church services abstaining from work and all business activities. The Onaeme have commemorated the 24th Anniversary of Onae Reh Dah in last 9 July 2011 under theme 'Healing and Reconciliation'.

As a result of launching Operation Bluebird on 11 July 1987, the village and people was never the same again anymore mar with killing of great leaders, atrocities, gross human rights violations, damaged and looted properties, torturing men and women beyond human imagination turning the whole village and surroundings to a land of nightmare and horror.

Every children of Onaeme Village have their story to tell you when you ask them to recount the nightmarish story of Operation Blue Bird 1987. So the above is a brief nutshell account of 9 July 1987 Incident, as suffering Onaeme say that the story cannot be retold just in a day or two, it will take months and even telling for months or years is not enough and will not console the sufferings that they have gone through yesterday. Only tears welcome me, a lump in my throat makes me numb when I try to rethink of those horrors and terror ridden torturous moments in our land shared an old man.

One village elder recounted the most 10(ten) unimaginable and horrific things that have taken place during the Operation Blue Bird which never happen in earlier life, they were: (1) Torturing innocent civilians by high ranking army officers up to the extent of burying alive after third degree torture, (2) agonizing and suffering of infants and pregnant women in the concentration camps, (3) dingy dungeon filled with human urine and dung, (4) dismantling of the best houses in the village (5) Letting to force fight among the villagers by the army, (6) unceremonious burial of the death by allowing only few people (2-3 people) to bury the death, (7) Killing of innocent civilians in front of villagers- which was possible only in cinema, (8) carrying goods beyond ordinary- normal capacity for human being to carry goods is 20 kg however, 100 kg are forced to be carried by 2(two) persons for far off distances, that never happened before and which may never happen again, (9) the unhygienic perilous exposure of infants to wet grounds, heavy rain and scorching sun in concentration camps, by Naga culture the infants and the lactating mothers are given best treatment even by the poorest of the poor, that has been denied overruling our culture and tradition, the women giving birth in the open ground and (10) killing of our innocent village elders.

Due to Operation Bluebird, 1987 incident at Oinam Hills, this serene and prosperous village was shocked and shaken physically, mentally, economically, socially, politically, psychologically, educationally and emotionally. 29 (twenty nine) years have gone and no justice is delivered so far, the people crying and hope for justice yet it seems so distant and far only questioning how long is too long the justice been delayed denying the justice to the people.
However the people of the village hasn't lost faith in humanity. They painfully has taken the task of rebuilding their beloved home and today the village is fill activities and it's palpable once you meet any Onaeme. The killing of the nine Indian soldiers was an act of war between the NSCN and the Indian government. The Indian government being the oppressor should and cannot at any point claim that the lives lost by the soldiers as a violation of human rights.

Education and literacy
There are two schools in Onaeme Village, a government run secondary school and St. John Bosco School. 
According to the Census of India 2011, Onaeme Village has a high literary rate of 90.67%.

Health Care
A Primary Health Centre (PHC) under the Ministry of Health and Family Welfare, Government of Manipur is available to cater to the health care of the villagers and the neighbouring villages.

References

Villages in Senapati district